The 1963 U.S. National Championships (now known as the US Open) was a tennis tournament that took place on the outdoor grass courts at the West Side Tennis Club, Forest Hills in New York City, United States. The tournament ran from 28 August until 8 September. It was the 83rd staging of the U.S. National Championships, and the fourth Grand Slam tennis event of 1963.

Finals

Men's singles

 Rafael Osuna defeated  Frank Froehling  7–5, 6–4, 6–2

Women's singles

 Maria Bueno defeated  Margaret Smith  7–5, 6–4

Men's doubles
 Chuck McKinley /  Dennis Ralston defeated  Rafael Osuna /  Antonio Palafox 9–7, 4–6, 5–7, 6–3, 11–9

Women's doubles
 Robyn Ebbern /  Margaret Smith defeated  Maria Bueno /  Darlene Hard, 4–6, 10–8, 6–3

Mixed doubles
 Margaret Smith /  Ken Fletcher defeated  Judy Tegart /  Ed Rubinoff 3–6, 8–6, 6–2

References

External links
Official US Open website

 
U.S. National Championships
U.S. National Championships (tennis) by year
U.S. National Championships
U.S. National Championships
U.S. National Championships